Conk was a hairstyle popular among African-American men from the 1920s to 1960s.

Conk may also refer to:

Conk (fungus), the fruiting body of polyphore fungi

People
 Cemil Conk (1873–1963), officer of the Ottoman Army
 Mehmet Hulusi Conk (1881–c. 1950), officer of the Ottoman Army and Turkish Army

See also
 Conch, a number of different medium to large-sized snails or other shells
 Konk (disambiguation)
 Norman Conks, a Catholic street gang in Glasgow from the 1880s to the 1960s
 Nose, sometimes referred to as conk, especially when large